Theodore David Butler Ragg  (23 November 1919 – 1 July 2002) was the Bishop of Huron in the last third of the  20th century.

Born into an ecclesiastical family and educated the University of Manitoba, he was ordained in 1950. After a curacy at St Michael and All Angels, Toronto he held incumbencies at Nokomis, Wolseley Wolseley and  North Vancouver before becoming Archdeacon of Saugeen. He was Bishop of Huron from 1974 to 1984 and died in 2002.

References

1919 births
University of Manitoba alumni
Anglican bishops of Huron
20th-century Anglican Church of Canada bishops
2002 deaths